The Netherlands Davis Cup team represents the Netherlands in Davis Cup tennis competition and are governed by the Royal Dutch Lawn Tennis Association.

The Netherlands will compete in the World Group Qualifiers in 2020. They last competed in the Davis Cup Finals in 2019

Their best performance is reaching the semi-finals of the World Group in 2001.

Current team (2022) 

 Botic van de Zandschulp
 Tallon Griekspoor
 Tim van Rijthoven
 Wesley Koolhof (Doubles player)
 Matwé Middelkoop (Doubles player)

Recent performances
A list of all match-ups since 2000

History
The Netherlands competed in its first Davis Cup in 1920.

See also
Davis Cup
Netherlands Fed Cup team

External links

Davis Cup teams
Davis Cup
Davis Cup